Desta may refer to:

Surname 
Aida Desta (1927–2013), Ethiopian princess
Araya Desta (born 1945), Eritrean diplomat
Asrat Desta (?–1977), Ethiopian politician
Bereket Desta (born 1990), Ethiopian sprinter
Hirut Desta (1930–2014), Ethiopian princess
Gebre Kristos Desta (1932–1981), Ethiopian modern artist
Iskinder Desta (1934–1974), Ethiopian nobility and naval officer
Tamrat Desta (1978–2018), Ethiopian singer
Seble Desta (1931–2023), Ethiopian princess
Sophia Desta (1934–2021), Ethiopian princess

Given name 
Desta Asgedom (1972–1992), Ethiopian athlete
Desta Damtew (ca. 1892– 1937), Ethiopian nobility and military personnel
Desta Girma Tadesse (born 1987), Ethiopian female long-distance runners

See also 
Desta Global, is an Indian startup technology company
Desta: The Memories Between, 2022 action video game by Ustwo

Amharic-language names

Desta, PLC is one of the largest privately owned apparel manufacturers and exporters in Ethiopia.